Roc Noir (French for "black rock") may refer to:

Grand Roc Noir, mountain in Switzerland
a triangular rock formation jutting from the east ridge of Annapurna Massif